The women's 400 metre freestyle competition of the swimming events at the 1973 World Aquatics Championships took place on September 7.

Records
Prior to the competition, the existing world and championship records were as follows.

The following records were established during the competition:

Results

Heats
26 swimmers participated in 4 heats, qualified swimmers are listed:

Final
The results of the final are below.

References

Freestyle 0400 metre, women's
World Aquatics Championships
1973 in women's swimming